Koti-Se-Phola is a community council located in the Mafeteng District of Lesotho. Its population in 2006 was 12,391.

Villages
The community of Koti-Se-Phola includes the villages of

ForeisetataHa 'NgoaeHa BeraHa BofihlaHa KhalimaneHa Khauta (Khobotle)Ha KhoeteHa KonoteHa Lehana

Ha LekoatsaHa LengoloHa MachafeelaHa MahlahlathaneHa MahooanaHa MakhabaneHa MofokaHa PantaHa Sebili

Ha SechabaHa SethabelaHa ThakanyaneHa ThakhalleLinotšingLiphakoeng (Khobotle)MaholongMajakaneng (Khobotle)Makhetheng

MakoabatingMaqhatsengMarallengMaserungMotse-MochaNtšekalleSehlabanengSeqhobongThabaneng

References

External links
 Google map of community villages

Populated places in Mafeteng District